Colin Robinson may refer to:

 Colin Robinson (footballer) (born 1960)
 Colin Robinson (activist) (1963–2021)
 Colin Robinson, a character in the TV series What We Do in the Shadows